Lucas Gonzalo Basualdo Reydo (born 2 February 1988) is an Argentine footballer who plays for Club Sports Salto as a central defender.

Club career
An Arsenal de Sarandí youth graduate, Basualdo only made his senior debut in Spain, while playing for Tercera División sides Club Lemos and Verín CF. In 2010, he moved to K-League club Daegu FC.

After making no appearances for Daegu, Basualdo rarely settled into any team, subsequently representing Tianjin Teda in China, Argentino de Quilmes, Sol de Mayo and Independiente de Rio Colorado in his home country, Municipal Tiquipaya and Aurora in Bolivia and Portuguesa in Brazil, aside for a two-month spell back at Lemos.

References

External links

1988 births
Living people
Footballers from La Plata
Argentine footballers
Association football defenders
Tercera División players
Daegu FC players
Tianjin Jinmen Tiger F.C. players
Bolivian Primera División players
Club Aurora players
Associação Portuguesa de Desportos players
Argentine expatriate footballers
Argentine expatriate sportspeople in Spain
Argentine expatriate sportspeople in South Korea
Argentine expatriate sportspeople in China
Argentine expatriate sportspeople in Bolivia
Argentine expatriate sportspeople in Brazil
Expatriate footballers in Spain
Expatriate footballers in South Korea
Expatriate footballers in China
Expatriate footballers in Bolivia
Expatriate footballers in Brazil
Expatriate footballers in Guatemala